David Greene (born Nottingham 1937) is an English architect, lecturer and writer on architectural subjects. He was a member of Archigram.

Early life and education
Greene was born in Nottingham and studied architecture at Art School. He started his career working on T-shirts designs for Paul Smith.

Current appointments
Visiting Professor of Architecture at Oxford Brookes University
External Examiner on the Masters in Advanced Research at the Bartlett

Awards
RIBA Gold Medal 2002 (Archigram).
Joint Annie Spinks Award with Sir Peter Cook (2002).

External links
Architectural Association staff
 Strange Harvest Interview

1937 births
Living people
Architects from Nottingham
Academics of Oxford Brookes University